Saint Brieuc may refer to:

 Saint Brioc, an early 6th-century Welshman who became the first Abbot of Saint-Brieuc
 Saint-Brieuc Challenger, a professional tennis tournament
 Stade Briochin, a French association football team

Places 
 Saint-Brieuc, a commune in the Côtes-d'Armor Department in Brittany in north-western France
 Arrondissement of Saint-Brieuc, France
 Gare de Saint-Brieuc, a railway station
 Roman Catholic Diocese of Saint-Brieuc
 Saint-Brieuc-des-Iffs, a commune in the Ille-et-Vilaine department in Brittany, France
 Saint-Brieuc-de-Mauron, a commune in the Morbihan department of Brittany, France